The Drosophila guarani species group is a lineage of vinegar fly in the Immigrans-tripunctata radiation of the subgenus Drosophila first proposed by Dobzhansky & Pavan (1943). At least 24 species have been described, distributed throughout Latin America.

Disambiguation 
The species group has been referred to as "Drosophila guarnini."

References

Drosophila
Insect species groups